An enemy or foe is an individual or group that is seen as forcefully adverse or threatening.

Enemy or The Enemy may refer to:
 Enemy combatant

Art, entertainment, and media

Fictional entities
 The Enemy, an alias of Morgoth, a fictional character in Tolkien's legendarium

Films 
 The Enemy (1916 film), directed by Paul Scardon, with Julia Swayne Gordon and Charles Kent
 The Enemy (1927 film), directed by Fred Niblo, starring Lillian Gish
 The Enemy (1952 film), directed by Giorgio Bianchi, starring Elisa Cegani
 The Enemy (1979 film), directed by Yılmaz Güney and Zeki Ökten, starring Aytaç Arman
 Enemy (1990 film), directed by George Rowe, starring Peter Fonda
 The Enemy (2001 film), directed by Tom Kinninmont, starring Roger Moore and Luke Perry
 Enemy (2013 film), a Canadian film starring Jake Gyllenhaal
 Enemy (2015 film), an Indian mystery film
 Enemy (2021 film), an Indian Tamil-language film

Literature
 The Enemy (Bagley novel), a 1977 espionage thriller by Desmond Bagley
 The Enemy (Child novel), a 2004 novel by Lee Child in the Jack Reacher thriller series
 The Enemy (Higson novel), a 2009 young adult novel by Charlie Higson and the first book in an eponymous series 
 The Enemy (short story), a 1958 science-fiction short story by Damon Knight
 The Enemy, a short story by Pearl S. Buck

Games
 CIMA: The Enemy (2003), a role-playing video game
 Enemy (eSports), a professional gaming team

Music

Groups
 Enemy (American band), an American band fronted by guitarist and vocalist Troy Van Leeuwen
 The Enemy (New Zealand band), a 1970s punk band from Dunedin, New Zealand
 The Enemy (English punk band), a 1980s punk band from Derby, Derbyshire, England
 The Enemy (English rock band), an indie rock band from Coventry, Warwickshire, England
 The Enemy, a band with Journey drummer Deen Castronovo
 The Enemy, an American band with Charlie Farren from The Joe Perry Project

Albums 
 Enemy (Blood for Blood album), 1997
 Enemy (Kristeen Young album), 1999

Songs 
 "Enemy" (Days of the New song), 1999
 "Enemy" (Drowning Pool song), 2007
 "Enemy" (Fozzy song)
 "Enemy" (Sandro Cavazza song), 2019
 "Enemy" (Sevendust song), 2003
 "Enemy" (The Brilliant Green song), 2007
 "Enemy" (Imagine Dragons and JID song), a 2021 song by Imagine Dragons & J.I.D for the League of Legends Netflix series Arcane
 "Enemy", a song by Beartooth from their album Disease
 "Enemy", a song by Blue Stahli from The Devil
 "Enemy", a song by Cascada from the album Original Me
 "Enemy", a song by Eve 6 from their album Horrorscope
 "Enemy", a song by Scars On Broadway from their eponymous album
 "Enemy", a song by Wage War from their album Blueprints
 "The Enemy" (Godsmack song)
 "The Enemy" (Paradise Lost song)
 "The Enemy", a song by Anthrax from the album Spreading the Disease
 "The Enemy", a song by Dark Tranquillity from the album Damage Done
 "The Enemy", a song by Dirty Pretty Things
 "The Enemy", a song by Guided by Voices from the album Isolation Drills
 "The Enemy", a song by Memphis May Fire from the album This Light I Hold

Television
 "The Enemy" (Space: Above and Beyond episode), an episode of Space: Above and Beyond
 "The Enemy" (Star Trek: The Next Generation), an episode of Star Trek: The Next Generation

Other uses
 The Enemy (film company), a film production company run by John Harlacher and Dave Buchwald

See also
 Enemies (disambiguation)
 Enemy Mine (disambiguation)
 Public enemy (disambiguation)
 The enemy of my enemy (disambiguation)
 The Enemy Within (disambiguation)